The football competition at the 2013 Francophone Games is a tournament open to under 20 age group national teams.

Participants

 

 (invitee) -withdrew
 - withdrew

 (invitee)

Matches

Group stage

Group A

Group B

Group C

Group D

Knockout stage

Semifinals

Third place playoff

Final

Squads

Burkina Faso

Canada

Republic of the Congo

Ivory Coast

Cameroon

Democratic Republic of the Congo

France

Gabon

Haiti

Lebanon
Source:

Morocco

Niger

Rwanda

Senegal

Source:

References 

football
2013
2013 in African football
2013
2013–14 in Moroccan football
2013–14 in French football
2013 in Canadian soccer
2013 in Cameroonian football
2013–14 in Lebanese football
2013–14 in Ivorian football